"Lift Me Up" is a Top 40 song by British singer-songwriter Howard Jones. It was written and produced by Ross Cullum and Jones, and appeared on Jones' 1992 album In the Running. 
"Lift Me Up" has been featured on several of Jones' compilations and live albums, including 1993's The Best of Howard Jones, 1996's Live Acoustic America and 2004's The Very Best of Howard Jones.

Chart performance
It was released as a single in 1992 and reached number 32 on the Billboard Hot 100 and number 13 on the Radio & Records Contemporary Hit Radio chart. It was Jones' ninth and last Billboard Top 40 hit. The song also reached number 10 on the Adult Contemporary chart, his last hit on that chart to date.

Charts

Personnel
Howard Jones – vocals, keyboards (incl. piano, synthesized guitars and bass)
Ross Cullum – drums
Tessa Niles, Carol Kenyon – backing vocals

References 

1992 singles
Howard Jones (English musician) songs
Songs written by Howard Jones (English musician)
Song recordings produced by Ross Cullum
Warner Music Group singles
Elektra Records singles
1992 songs
Songs written by Ross Cullum